P3 protein is a protein that in humans is encoded by the SLC10A3 gene.

This gene maps to a GC-rich region of the X chromosome and was identified by its proximity to a CpG island. It is thought to be a housekeeping gene.

See also

References

Further reading

Solute carrier family